Cleaners is an American action streaming television series directed by Paul Leyden, and created by Paul Leyden and Morgan O'Neill. The series stars Emmanuelle Chriqui, Emily Osment, David Arquette, Gina Gershon and Missi Pyle and premiered on Crackle on October 3, 2013. On May 3, 2014, the series was renewed for a second season.

Premise

Season 1
Two highly trained and lethal female contract killers run an errand for their boss, Mother, that goes badly and the duo quickly find themselves the target of their boss's client, the FBI, and even their own boss whose team of assassins is now out to eliminate them.

Season 2
On a Caribbean island two weeks after the end of season one, Veronica and Roxie realize they have not escaped their past yet. They try to take down a major drug cartel and are entangled in the trappings of Mother, who is trying to hunt them down. All the while, Agent Barnes is on a mission to take down Mother.

Cast and characters

Main role

Recurring cast

Episodes

Season 1 (2013)

Season 2 (2014)

Awards and nominations

See also
List of original programs distributed by Sony Crackle

References

External links
 
 

2013 American television series debuts
2014 American television series endings
2010s American crime drama television series
American action television series
English-language television shows
Crackle (streaming service) original programming